The Bloomfield Bridge is a bridge in Pittsburgh, Pennsylvania, which carries four lanes of traffic across Skunk Hollow, a steep ravine between the densely populated neighborhoods of Bloomfield and Polish Hill.

History
The first Bloomfield Bridge was a steel cantilever bridge built in 1914 by the Fort Pitt Bridge Works. It was designed by engineer T. J. Wilkerson and architect Stanley L. Roush and cost about $500,000. At the time of construction, it was the longest, highest, and one of the most expensive bridges in Pittsburgh. The bridge was dedicated on November 19, 1914, with what the Pittsburgh Post described as a "monster celebration" which included a wedding for a local couple performed at the midpoint of the span. This tradition was continued with the dedication of the replacement bridge in 1986, which also featured a wedding.

The old Bloomfield Bridge was closed in 1978 and demolished in 1980. The replacement crossing was erected in 1986, after the previous bridge was deemed deficient after years of heavy traffic, including that of popular Pittsburgh Railways streetcar lines until their 1960s conversion to buses. Although the first Bloomfield Bridge was closed in 1978, state funding issues halted work on the construction of a successor until 1984.

Location
On the Bloomfield side of the bridge, connections are made to Liberty Avenue, the commercial heart of the traditionally Italian (and increasingly Asian) neighborhood. On the Polish Hill side, PA 380 can be accessed, which runs toward Downtown Pittsburgh and Oakland, the home of several major universities.

The Bloomfield Bridge spans a large number of railroad tracks, which are portions of lines managed by CSX and Norfolk Southern. The Martin Luther King Jr. East Busway, a bus rapid transit system, also traverses the ravine. Also under the edifice is a community football and baseball field. Originally known as Dean's Field, it is historically significant as the place where Johnny Unitas played semi-pro football before jumpstarting his NFL career. After a shootout that killed three police officers, the area was renamed after a fallen officer who resided nearby.

References

External links

 Bloomfield Bridge at pghbridges.com

Bridges in Pittsburgh
Bridges completed in 1986
Road bridges in Pennsylvania
Railroad bridges in Pennsylvania
Road-rail bridges in the United States
Steel bridges in the United States
Girder bridges in the United States